In the 1991-92 Dutch football season, PSV Eindhoven competed in the Eredivisie. PSV won the Eredivisie that season and also participated in the European Cup going out in the second round to Anderlecht.

First-team squad

Transfers

In
  Tom Van Mol -  Anderlecht U19 - Free
  Wim de Ron -  VV Dinteloord
  Adri van Tiggelen -  Anderlecht
  Wim Kieft -  Bordeaux
  Ernest Faber -  Nijmegen

Out
  John Bosman -  Anderlecht - £810,000
  Raymond Beerens -  Waalwijk - Loan
  Jozef Chovanec -  Sparta Praha
  Geoffrey Prommanyon -  FC Eindhoven - Loan
  Ernest Faber -  Sparta Rotterdam - Loan
  Adick Koot -  Cannes
  Jan Nederburgh -  Telstar

Results

Eredivisie

European Cup

References 

PSV Eindhoven seasons
Dutch football championship-winning seasons
PSV Eindhoven